The Catalog Committee, or The Catalog Committee of Artists Meeting for Cultural Change (AMCC), was a group formed in 1975 to protest against the Whitney Museum of American Art's bicentennial exhibition. The Committee consisted of fifteen artists and two art historians.

History 
In 1975, the Whitney Museum of American Art's bicentennial exhibition decided to feature a collection by John D. Rockefeller called Three Centuries of American Art. The collection, which showed mainly eighteenth and nineteenth century art, was heavily criticized for featuring only one African American, one woman artist, and no Hispanic or native American artists. A group called Artists Meeting for Cultural Change (AMCC) published an open letter "to the American Art Community" on December 14, 1975 in response to the Whitney Museum's decision. In the letter, the AMCC referred to Rockefeller's exhibition as "a blatant example of a large cultural institution writing the history of American art as though the last decade of cultural and social reassessment had never taken place." After ultimately being disregarded by the Whitney Museum's director Tom Armstrong, the group continued protesting and considered different actions.

In the open letter, the AMCC spoke of alternative strategies: "picketing to coincide with key American history holidays, alternative street exhibitions and an alternative catalogue, a slide show for educational purposes and letters to Congresspersons."

One of their alternative strategies, "an alternative catalogue," was eventually created and published under the title An Anti-Catalog.

An Anti-Catalog 
An Anti-Catalog is a book written and published by the Catalog Committee of AMCC in 1977. Originally meant to criticize Rockefeller's work, An Anti-Catalog became a collection of articles and documents that encompassed African-American art, native American art, art by women, and multiple critiques on cultural institutions. The eighty-page book took almost a year to make and was a product of collective work and determination by fifteen artists and two art historians from the AMCC.

Contributors 

 Rudolf Baranik
 Sarina Bromberg 
 Sarah Charlesworth
 Susanne Cohn
 Carol Duncan
 Shawn Gargagliano
 Eunice Golden
 Janet Koenig
 Joseph Kosuth
 Anthony McCall
 Paul Pechter
 Elaine Bendock Pelosini
 Aaron Roseman
 Larry Rosing
 Ann Marie Rousseau
 Alan Wallach
 Walter Weissman
 Jimmie Durham

References 

Whitney Museum of American Art
1975 in art
Social movements in the United States
Rockefeller family